The Satyr's Play / Cerberus is an album composed by John Zorn which as recorded in New York City in January and April 2010 and released on the Tzadik label in April 2011. Zorn signed and numbered 666 copies of the CD and produced 66 copies of a limited edition book version which were individualised and hand bound in black goat skin.

Reception

Allmusic called the album "An intriguing Zorn project, highly recommended for Zorn lovers".

Track listing
All compositions by John Zorn
 "Ode I" - 3:48   
 "Ode II" - 3:39   
 "Ode III" - 2:54   
 "Ode IV" - 3:50   
 "Ode V" - 2:35   
 "Ode VI" - 4:33   
 "Ode VII" - 3:36   
 "Ode VIII" - 1:39  
 "Cerberus" - 10:34

Personnel
Cyro Baptista, Kenny Wollesen - percussion (tracks 1-8) 
Peter Evans - trumpet (track 9)
David Taylor - bass trombone (track 9) 
Marcus Rojas - tuba (track 9)

Production
Marc Urselli - engineer, audio mixer
John Zorn and Kazunori Sugiyama – producers

References

2011 albums
John Zorn albums
Albums produced by John Zorn
Tzadik Records albums